Transforming growth factor beta receptor I (activin A receptor type II-like kinase, 53kDa) is a membrane-bound TGF beta receptor protein of the TGF-beta receptor family for the TGF beta superfamily of signaling ligands. TGFBR1 is its human gene.

Function 

The protein encoded by this gene forms a heteromeric complex with type II TGF-β receptors when bound to TGF-β, transducing the TGF-β signal from the cell surface to the cytoplasm. The encoded protein is a serine/threonine protein kinase. Mutations in this gene have been associated with Loeys–Dietz aortic aneurysm syndrome (LDS, LDAS).

Interactions 

TGF beta receptor 1 has been shown to interact with:

 Caveolin 1, 
 Endoglin, 
 FKBP1A, 
 FNTA, 
 Heat shock protein 90kDa alpha (cytosolic), member A1 
 Mothers against decapentaplegic homolog 7, 
 PPP2R2A, 
 STRAP,
 TGF beta 1,  and
 TGF beta receptor 2.

Inhibitors
 GW-788,388
 LY-2109761
 Galunisertib (LY-2157299)
 SB-431,542
 SB-525,334
 Repsox

Animal studies 
Defects are observed when the TGFBR-1 gene is either knocked-out or when a constitutively active TGFBR-1 mutant (that is active in the presence or absence of ligand) is knocked-in.

In mouse TGFBR-1 knock-out models, the female mice were sterile. They developed oviductal diverticula and defective uterine smooth muscle, meaning that uterine smooth muscle layers were poorly formed. Oviductal diverticula are small, bulging pouches located on the oviduct, which is the tube that transports the ovum from the ovary to the uterus. This deformity of the oviduct occurred bilaterally and resulted in impaired embryo development and impaired transit of the embryos to the uterus. Ovulation and fertilization still occurred in the knock-outs, however remnants of embryos were found in these oviductal diverticula.

In mouse TGFBR-1 knock-in models where a constitutively active TGFBR-1 gene is conditionally induced, the over-activation of the TGFBR-1 receptors lead to infertility, a reduction in the number of uterine glands, and hypermuscled uteri (an increased amount of smooth muscle in the uteri).

These experiments show that the TGFB-1 receptor plays a critical role in the function of the female reproductive tract. They also show that genetic mutations in the TGFBR-1 gene may lead to fertility issues in women.

References

Further reading

External links 
  GeneReviews/NIH/NCBI/UW entry on Thoracic Aortic Aneurysms and Aortic Dissections
 GeneReviews/NCBI/NIH/UW entry on Loeys-Dietz Syndrome

TGF beta receptors